Camryn Bynum (born July 19, 1998) is an American football strong safety for the Minnesota Vikings of the National Football League (NFL). He played college football at California and was drafted by the Vikings in the fourth round of the 2021 NFL Draft.

Early life and high school
Bynum grew up in Corona, California and attended Centennial High School. He was initially considered undersized as a football player and did not play on the varsity team until his junior year. As a senior, Bynum recorded 70 tackles and nine passes defended.

College career
Bynum committed to California on July 1, 2015.

After redshirting his true freshman season, Bynum became a starter during his redshirt freshman season and finished the year with 58 tackles, eight passes broken up and two interceptions and was named Cal's Most Valuable Freshman. Bynum recorded 48 tackles and 2.5 tackles for loss with 12 passes broken up and two interceptions as a redshirt sophomore. As a redshirt junior, Bynum recorded 63 tackles, 3.0 tackles for loss, one interception, and nine passes broken up and was named second-team All-Pac-12 Conference. Following the announcement that Pac-12 would postpone the 2020 season, Bynum announced that he would opt out of the season in order to focus on preparing for the 2021 NFL Draft. Bynum reversed his decision to opt out after the Pac-12 announced that they would resume fall football.

Bynum was the only Golden Bear to start in all 42 games from 2017 to 2020, starting every game at cornerback. He graduated from UC Berkeley in December 2020 with a degree in Business.

Professional career

Bynum was selected 125th overall in the 2021 NFL Draft by the Minnesota Vikings, who envisioned him transitioning to safety.

Bynum made his regular season debut in the Vikings' Week 1 overtime loss at the Cincinnati Bengals, in which he recorded two solo tackles. He made his first start and recorded his first interception in the Vikings' Week 9 overtime loss at the Baltimore Ravens.

Personal life
Bynum is of Filipino descent through his mother. His great grandmother also traces her roots to Leyte.

References

External links

 Minnesota Vikings bio

California Golden Bears bio

1998 births
Living people
Sportspeople from Corona, California
Players of American football from California
American football cornerbacks
California Golden Bears football players
Minnesota Vikings players
American sportspeople of Filipino descent